Kashif Naved (born 15 August 1983) is a Pakistani first-class cricketer who played for Faisalabad cricket team.

References

External links
 

1983 births
Living people
Pakistani cricketers
Faisalabad cricketers
Panadura Sports Club cricketers
People from Chichawatni